CIDR is Classless Inter-Domain Routing, a method for allocating IP addresses and routing Internet Protocol packets.

CIDR may also refer to:

Biology and medicine
 Controlled internal drug release, devices used in livestock for the synchronization of estrus
 Center for Infectious Disease Research at the University of Wisconsin
 Center for Global Infectious Disease Research, now a part of the Seattle Children's Research Institute
 Not to be confused with the Center for Infectious Disease Research and Policy at UMinn

Miscellaneous other uses
 Conference on Innovative Data Systems Research
 CIDR-FM, an FM radio station in Windsor, Ontario, Canada